Neoklis Avdalas (Greek: Νεοκλής Αβδάλας; born February 4, 2006) is a Greek professional basketball player for Panathinaikos of the Greek Basket League and the EuroLeague. He is 1.96 m (6'5") tall, and he can play at the point guard and shooting guard positions. Neoklis is the youngest son of former basketball player Dimitris Avdalas.

Professional career
Avdalas began his professional career in 2021 with Panathinaikos, under coaches Dimitrios Priftis and Georgios Vovoras. During his first season, he appeared in a total of 6 EuroLeague games and 10 Greek Basket League games.

In January 2022, Avdalas signed a new five-year professional contract with Panathinaikos.

National team career

Greek junior national team
Avdalas represented the Greek Under-16 junior national team in the International Under-16 Tournament that took place in Messini between July 28 and July 31, 2021, participating Greece, Croatia, Poland and North Macedonia. Avdalas was the leading scorer of Greece, scoring 68 points in four games.

References

2006 births
Living people
Greek men's basketball players
Greek Basket League players
Panathinaikos B.C. players
Point guards
Shooting guards
Basketball players from Athens